Caecilius may refer to:

 Caecilia gens, an ancient Roman family, including a list of people with the name
 Lucius Caecilius Iucundus, a Roman inhabitant of Pompeii, and central character in the Cambridge Latin Course series
 Caecilius (insect), a genus of insect
 Kusaila (Latin: Caecilius), a 7th-century Berber king

See also

 Caecilian, a type of amphibian
 Caecilia, a genus of amphibians in the family Caeciliidae
 Kaecilius, a fictional supervillain in Marvel Comics